Haraprasad Das (born 15 Jaunuary 1946), is an Odia language poet, essayist and columnist.
Das, has twelve works of poetry, four of prose, three translations and one piece of fiction to his credit.

Haraprasad, is a retired civil servant. He has served various UN bodies as an expert.

Awards
He is a recipient of numerous awards and recognitions including
 Kalinga Literary Award, 2017, Kalinga Literary Festival
 Moortidevi Award, 2013 
 Gangadhar Meher Award, 2008 
 Kendra Sahitya Akademi Award, 1999
 Sarala Award, 2008

References

1945 births
Living people
Recipients of the Sahitya Akademi Award in Odia
Recipients of the Odisha Sahitya Akademi Award
Recipients of the Gangadhar National Award
Poets from Odisha
Odia-language poets
Odia-language writers
Writers from Odisha
Indian male essayists
20th-century Indian translators
20th-century Indian essayists
20th-century Indian poets
20th-century Indian male writers